Alfred Umgeher (3 October 1926 – 2 November 2013) was an Austrian sprint canoer who competed in the late 1940s. He won a silver medal in the K-4 1000 m event at the 1948 ICF Canoe Sprint World Championships in London. Umgeher also competed at the 1948 Summer Olympics in London, finishing ninth in the K-2 10000 m event.

References

Alfred Umgeher's profile at Sports Reference.com

1926 births
2013 deaths
Austrian male canoeists
Canoeists at the 1948 Summer Olympics
Olympic canoeists of Austria
ICF Canoe Sprint World Championships medalists in kayak